This is a list of vehicles designed or produced by Kamaz, a Russian truck manufacturer.

Generations

Models

Trucks

From 1976 - 2015, KAMAZ has produced trucks as follows :

 KAMAZ 4308 4x2 Medium-range truck & 4x2 Cab and Chassis Unit
 KAMAZ 4326 4x4 Side truck & 4x4 Cab and Chassis Unit
 KAMAZ 4326-9 Dakar 4x4 Dakar Rally Sport truck
 KAMAZ 4911 Extreme 4x4 Civilian Sport truck Dakar Rally
 KAMAZ 43114 6x6 Flat bed truck & 6x6 Cab and Chassis Unit
 KAMAZ 43118 6x6 Flat bed truck & 6x6 Cab and Chassis Unit
 KAMAZ 43253 4x2 Flat bed truck & 4x2 Cab and Chassis Unit
 KAMAZ 53205 6x4 Cab and Chassis Unit
 KAMAZ 53215 6x4 Flat bed truck & 6x4 Cab and Chassis Unit
 KAMAZ 53228 6x6 Cab and Chassis Unit
 KAMAZ 53229 6x4 Cab and Chassis Unit
 KAMAZ 53205 6x4 Cab and Chassis Unit
 KAMAZ 52212 6x4L Cab and Chassis Unit 
 KAMAZ 52213 6x4L Cab and Chassis Unit
 KAMAZ 53605 4x2 Dump truck
 KAMAZ 5513 6x4 Cab and Chassis Unit & 6x4 Garbage truck
 KAMAZ 5320 6x4 Flat bed truck & 6x4 Cab and Chassis Unit
 KAMAZ 53202 6x4 Flat bed truck & 6x4 Cab and Chassis Unit
 KAMAZ 53212 6x4 Flat bed truck & 6x4 Cab and Chassis Unit
 KAMAZ 53213 6x4 Flat bed truck & 6x4 Cab and Chassis Unit
 KAMAZ 53229 6x4 Flat bed truck & 6x4 Cab and Chassis Unit
 KAMAZ 53228 6x6 Flat bed truck & 6x6 Cab and Chassis Unit
 KAMAZ 5511 6x4 Dump truck
 KAMAZ 5512 6x6 Dump truck
 KAMAZ 45141 6x6 Dump truck
 KAMAZ 54115 6x4 Tractor truck & 6x4 Cab and Chassis Unit
 KAMAZ 55111 6x4 Dump truck & 6x4 Cab and Chassis Unit
 KAMAZ 6520 6x4 Dump truck & 6x4 Cab and Chassis Unit
 KAMAZ 6522 6x6 Dump truck & 6x6 Cab and Chassis Unit
 KAMAZ 6540 8x4 Dump truck & 8x4 Cab and Chassis Unit
 KAMAZ 6560 8x8 Cab and Chassis Unit
 KAMAZ 5360 4x2 Cab and Chassis Unit
 KAMAZ 53602 6x2 Cab and Chassis Unit
 KAMAZ 43082 6x2 Cab and Chassis Unit
 KAMAZ 6360 6x4 Cab and Chassis Unit
 KAMAZ 53228 6x6 Cab and Chassis Unit
 KAMAZ 53229 6x4 Cab and Chassis Unit
 KAMAZ 5523 6x6 Logging truck
 KAMAZ 63968 Typhoon 6x6 Armored infantry transport
 KAMAZ 65111 6x6 Dump truck
 KAMAZ 65115 6x4 Dump truck & 6x4 Cab and Chassis Unit
 KAMAZ 65116 6x4 Tractor truck
 KAMAZ 65117 6x4 Flat bed truck & 6x4 Cab and Chassis Unit

Tractor truck
 KAMAZ 6440 6x4 Tractor truck
 KAMAZ 65116 6x4 Tractor truck
 KAMAZ 6460 "Continent" 6x4 Tractor truck
 KAMAZ 6460-73 6x4 Tractor truck
 KAMAZ 5460 "Continent" 4x2 Tractor truck
 KAMAZ 5460-73 4x2 Tractor truck
 KAMAZ 5460-06 "Cummins" 4x2 Tractor truck
 KAMAZ 5470 4x2 Tractor truck
 KAMAZ 5490 4x2 Tractor truck
 KAMAZ 5410 6x4 Tractor truck
 KAMAZ 54101 6x4 Tractor truck
 KAMAZ 54102 6x4 Tractor truck
 KAMAZ 54112 6x4 Tractor truck
 KAMAZ 54105 6x4 Tractor truck
 KAMAZ 5415 4x2 Tractor truck
 KAMAZ 5415M 4x2 Tractor truck
 KAMAZ 5425 4x2 Tractor truck
 KAMAZ 5425M 4x2 Tractor truck
 KAMAZ 44108 6x6 Tractor truck
 KAMAZ 65225 6x6 Tractor truck
 KAMAZ 65226 6x6 Tractor truck
 KAMAZ 65228 8x8 Tractor truck

Engines
KAMAZ Engines
 KAMAZ 740.10 180 - 210 HP V8
 KAMAZ 740.31 225 - 240 HP V8 Turbo Euro 0
 KAMAZ 740.73 400 HP V8 Turbo Euro 4
 KAMAZ 740.622 280 HP V8 Turbo Euro 3
 KAMAZ 740.632 400 HP V8 Turbo Euro 4
 KAMAZ 740.662 300 HP V8 Turbo Euro 4
 KAMAZ 740.602 360 HP V8 Turbo Euro 3
 KAMAZ 740.652 260 HP V8 Turbo Euro 3
 KAMAZ 7403.10 260 HP V8 Turbo Euro 0
 KAMAZ 74037.10 260 HP V8 Turbo Euro 0
 KAMAZ 74006.10 220 HP V8 Turbo
 KAMAZ 7409 series 180 - 360 HP V8 Turbo (240HP - 360HP) Euro 3 - 4 (240HP - 360HP)
KAMAZ Cummins
 Cummins ISB6.7e4 245 - 300 HP I6 Turbo Euro 2 - 4
 Cummins ISB6.5e4 185 HP I6 Turbo Euro 2
 1989 360HP Cummins L6 Turbo Euro 2
KAMAZ Mercedes
 Daimler OM457LA 428 HP I6 Turbo Euro 5

Other vehicles
 KAMAZ 4310 6x6 Cab and Chassis Unit
 KAMAZ 43269 Vystrel (BPM-97) Wheeled armoured vehicle
 KAMAZ Barhan 4x4 multipurpose vehicle, a large prototype SUV built on a Kamaz-43501 chassis, made by CaRS, a private company. Original prototype was on a GAZ-66 chassis.

Kamaz Mustang
The  Kamaz Мустанг (Mustang) is a family of general military utility trucks with numerous variants. The family is based on the 1st generation KamAZ family launched in the early 1980s. A three-person cab is standard across the Mustang range. It has a sleeping berth and tilts forward for engine access. This cab can be fitted with an add-on armour kit.

The Mustang family is available in eight (8) models:

Original three:

And the Kamaz-43501, -5450, -6450, and -5350 trucks with armoured cabs.:

Gallery

References

Kamaz
Kamaz